San Stefano Grand Plaza is a structural complex including apartments, offices, a shopping mall and a marina in Alexandria, Egypt. It was designed by WZMH Architects.

See also 
 List of shopping malls in Egypt

References

Hotels in Alexandria
Four Seasons hotels and resorts
Shopping malls in Egypt
WZMH Architects buildings
Buildings and structures in Alexandria